2008 Hong Kong–Shanghai Inter Club Championship is the 3rd staging of Hong Kong-Shanghai Inter Club Championship.

Result

South China AA
Shan
Hong Kong–Shanghai Inter Club Championship